The Office of Strategic Services (OSS) was the intelligence agency of the United States during World War II. The OSS was formed as an agency of the Joint Chiefs of Staff (JCS) to coordinate espionage activities behind enemy lines for all branches of the United States Armed Forces. Other OSS functions included the use of propaganda, subversion, and post-war planning.

The OSS was dissolved a month after the end of the war. Intelligence tasks were shortly later resumed and carried over by its successors the Department of State's Bureau of Intelligence and Research (INR), and the independent Central Intelligence Agency (CIA).

On December 14, 2016, the organization was collectively honored with a Congressional Gold Medal.

Origin 
Prior to the formation of the OSS, the various departments of the executive branch, including the State, Treasury, Navy, and War Departments conducted American intelligence activities on an ad hoc basis, with no overall direction, coordination, or control. The US Army and US Navy had separate code-breaking departments: Signal Intelligence Service and OP-20-G. (A previous code-breaking operation of the State Department, the MI-8, run by Herbert Yardley, had been shut down in 1929 by Secretary of State Henry Stimson, deeming it an inappropriate function for the diplomatic arm, because "gentlemen don't read each other's mail.") The FBI was responsible for domestic security and anti-espionage operations.

President Franklin D. Roosevelt was concerned about American intelligence deficiencies. On the suggestion of William Stephenson, the senior British intelligence officer in the western hemisphere, Roosevelt requested that William J. Donovan draft a plan for an intelligence service based on the British Secret Intelligence Service (MI6) and Special Operations Executive (SOE). Donovan envisioned a single agency responsible for foreign intelligence and special operations involving commandos, disinformation, partisan and guerrilla activities. After submitting his work, "Memorandum of Establishment of Service of Strategic Information", he was appointed "coordinator of information" on July 11, 1941, heading the new organization known as the office of the Coordinator of Information (COI).

Thereafter the organization was developed with British assistance; Donovan had responsibilities but no actual powers and the existing US agencies were skeptical if not hostile. Until some months after Pearl Harbor, the bulk of OSS intelligence came from the UK. British Security Co-ordination (BSC) trained the first OSS agents in Canada, until training stations were set up in the US with guidance from BSC instructors, who also provided information on how the SOE was arranged and managed. The British immediately made available their short-wave broadcasting capabilities to Europe, Africa, and the Far East and provided equipment for agents until American production was established.

The Office of Strategic Services was established by a Presidential military order issued by President Roosevelt on June 13, 1942, to collect and analyze strategic information required by the Joint Chiefs of Staff and to conduct special operations not assigned to other agencies. During the war, the OSS supplied policymakers with facts and estimates, but the OSS never had jurisdiction over all foreign intelligence activities. The FBI was left responsible for intelligence work in Latin America, and the Army and Navy continued to develop and rely on their own sources of intelligence.

Activities 

OSS proved especially useful in providing a worldwide overview of the German war effort, its strengths and weaknesses. In direct operations it was successful in supporting Operation Torch in French North Africa in 1942, where it identified pro-Allied potential supporters and located landing sites. OSS operations in neutral countries, especially Stockholm, Sweden, provided in-depth information on German advanced technology. The Madrid station set up agent networks in France that supported the Allied invasion of southern France in 1944. Most famous were the operations in Switzerland run by Allen Dulles that provided extensive information on German strength, air defenses, submarine production, and the V-1 and V-2 weapons. It revealed some of the secret German efforts in chemical and biological warfare. Switzerland's station also supported resistance fighters in France, Austria and Italy, and helped with the surrender of German forces in Italy in 1945.

For the duration of World War II, the Office of Strategic Services was conducting multiple activities and missions, including collecting intelligence by spying, performing acts of sabotage, waging propaganda war, organizing and coordinating anti-Nazi resistance groups in Europe, and providing military training for anti-Japanese guerrilla movements in Asia, among other things. At the height of its influence during World War II, the OSS employed almost 24,000 people.

From 1943–1945, the OSS played a major role in training Kuomintang troops in China and Burma, and recruited Kachin and other indigenous irregular forces for sabotage as well as guides for Allied forces in Burma fighting the Japanese Army.  Among other activities, the OSS helped arm, train, and supply resistance movements in areas occupied by the Axis powers during World War II, including Mao Zedong's Red Army in China (known as the Dixie Mission) and the Viet Minh in French Indochina. OSS officer Archimedes Patti played a central role in OSS operations in French Indochina and met frequently with Ho Chi Minh in 1945.

One of the greatest accomplishments of the OSS during World War II was its penetration of Nazi Germany by OSS operatives. The OSS was responsible for training German and Austrian individuals for missions inside Germany. Some of these agents included exiled communists and Socialist party members, labor activists, anti-Nazi prisoners-of-war, and German and Jewish refugees. The OSS also recruited and ran one of the war's most important spies, the German diplomat Fritz Kolbe.

From 1943 the OSS was in contact with the Austrian resistance group around Kaplan Heinrich Maier. As a result, plans and production facilities for V-2 rockets, Tiger tanks and aircraft (Messerschmitt Bf 109, Messerschmitt Me 163 Komet, etc.) were passed on to Allied general staffs in order to enable Allied bombers to get accurate air strikes. The Maier group informed very early about the mass murder of Jews through its contacts with the Semperit factory near Auschwitz. The group was gradually dismantled by the German authorities because of a double agent who worked for both the OSS and the Gestapo. This uncovered a transfer of money from the Americans to Vienna via Istanbul and Budapest, and most of the members were executed after a People's Court hearing.

In 1943, the Office of Strategic Services set up operations in Istanbul. Turkey, as a neutral country during the Second World War, was a place where both the Axis and Allied powers had spy networks. The railroads connecting central Asia with Europe, as well as Turkey's close proximity to the Balkan states, placed it at a crossroads of intelligence gathering. The goal of the OSS Istanbul operation called Project Net-1 was to infiltrate and extenuate subversive action in the old Ottoman and Austro-Hungarian Empires.

The head of operations at OSS Istanbul was a banker from Chicago named Lanning "Packy" Macfarland, who maintained a cover story as a banker for the American lend-lease program. Macfarland hired Alfred Schwarz, a Czechoslovakian engineer and businessman who came to be known as "Dogwood" and ended up establishing the Dogwood information chain. Dogwood in turn hired a personal assistant named Walter Arndt and established himself as an employee of the Istanbul Western Electrik Kompani. Through Schwartz and Arndt the OSS was able to infiltrate anti-fascist groups in Austria, Hungary, and Germany. Schwartz was able to convince Romanian, Bulgarian, Hungarian, and Swiss diplomatic couriers to smuggle American intelligence information into these territories and establish contact with elements antagonistic to the Nazis and their collaborators. Couriers and agents memorized information and produced analytical reports; when they were not able to memorize effectively they recorded information on microfilm and hid it in their shoes or hollowed pencils. Through this process information about the Nazi regime made its way to Macfarland and the OSS in Istanbul and eventually to Washington.

While the OSS "Dogwood-chain" produced a lot of information, its reliability was increasingly questioned by British intelligence. By May 1944, through collaboration between the OSS, British intelligence, Cairo, and Washington, the entire Dogwood-chain was found to be unreliable and dangerous. Planting phony information into the OSS was intended to misdirect the resources of the Allies. Schwartz's Dogwood-chain, which was the largest American intelligence gathering tool in occupied territory, was shortly thereafter shut down.

The OSS purchased Soviet code and cipher material (or Finnish information on them) from émigré Finnish army officers in late 1944. Secretary of State Edward Stettinius, Jr., protested that this violated an agreement President Roosevelt made with the Soviet Union not to interfere with Soviet cipher traffic from the United States. General Donovan might have copied the papers before returning them the following January, but there is no record of Arlington Hall receiving them, and CIA and NSA archives have no surviving copies. This codebook was in fact used as part of the Venona decryption effort, which helped uncover large-scale Soviet espionage in North America.

RYPE was the codename of the airborne unit who was dropped in the Norwegian mountains of Snåsa on March 24, 1945 to carry out sabotage actions behind enemy lines. From the base at the Gjefsjøen mountain farm, the group conducted successful railroad sabotages, with the intention of preventing the withdrawal of German forces from northern Norway. Operasjon Rype was the only U.S. operation on German-occupied Norwegian soil during WW2. The group consisted mainly of Norwegian Americans recruited from the 99th Infantry Battalion. Operasjon Rype was led by William Colby.

The OSS sent four teams of two under Captain Stephen Vinciguerra (codename Algonquin, teams Alsace, Poissy, S&S and Student), with Operation Varsity in March 1945 to infiltrate and report from behind enemy lines, but none succeeded. Team S&S had two agents in Wehrmacht uniforms and a captured Kϋbelwagon; to report by radio. But the Kϋbelwagon was put out of action while in the glider; three tires and the long-range radio were shot up (German gunners were told to attack the gliders not the tow planes).

Weapons and gadgets 

The OSS espionage and sabotage operations produced a steady demand for highly specialized equipment. General Donovan invited experts, organized workshops, and funded labs that later formed the core of the Research & Development Branch. Boston chemist Stanley P. Lovell became its first head, and Donovan humorously called him his "Professor Moriarty". Throughout the war years, the OSS Research & Development successfully adapted Allied weapons and espionage equipment, and produced its own line of novel spy tools and gadgets, including silenced pistols, lightweight sub-machine guns, "Beano" grenades that exploded upon impact, explosives disguised as lumps of coal ("Black Joe") or bags of Chinese flour ("Aunt Jemima"), acetone time delay fuses for limpet mines, compasses hidden in uniform buttons, playing cards that concealed maps, a 16mm Kodak camera in the shape of a matchbox, tasteless poison tablets ("K" and "L" pills), and cigarettes laced with tetrahydrocannabinol acetate (an extract of Indian hemp) to induce uncontrollable chattiness.

The OSS also developed innovative communication equipment such as wiretap gadgets, electronic beacons for locating agents, and the "Joan-Eleanor" portable radio system that made it possible for operatives on the ground to establish secure contact with a plane that was preparing to land or drop cargo. The OSS Research & Development also printed fake German and Japanese-issued identification cards, and various passes, ration cards, and counterfeit money.

On August 28, 1943, Stanley Lovell was asked to make a presentation in front of a hostile Joint Chiefs of Staff, who were skeptical of OSS plans beyond collecting military intelligence and were ready to split the OSS between the Army and the Navy. While explaining the purpose and mission of his department and introducing various gadgets and tools, he reportedly casually dropped into a waste basket a Hedy, a panic-inducing explosive device in the shape of a firecracker, which shortly produced a loud shrieking sound followed by a deafening boom. The presentation was interrupted and did not resume since everyone in the room fled. In reality, the Hedy, jokingly named after Hollywood movie star Hedy Lamarr for her ability to distract men, later saved the lives of some trapped OSS operatives.

Not all projects worked. Some ideas were odd, such as a failed attempt to use insects to spread anthrax in Spain.  Stanley Lovell was later quoted saying, "It was my policy to consider any method whatever that might aid the war, however unorthodox or untried".

In 1939, a young physician named Christian J. Lambertsen developed an oxygen rebreather set (the Lambertsen Amphibious Respiratory Unit) and demonstrated it to the OSS—after already being rejected by the U.S. Navy—in a pool at the Shoreham Hotel in Washington D.C., in 1942. The OSS not only bought into the concept, they hired Lambertsen to lead the program and build up the dive element for the organization. His responsibilities included training and developing methods of combining self-contained diving and swimmer delivery including the Lambertsen Amphibious Respiratory Unit for the OSS "Operational Swimmer Group". Growing involvement of the OSS with coastal infiltration and water-based sabotage eventually led to creation of the OSS Maritime Unit.

Facilities
At Camp X, near Whitby, Ontario, an "assassination and elimination" training program was operated by the British Special Operations Executive, assigning exceptional masters in the art of knife-wielding combat, such as William E. Fairbairn and Eric A. Sykes, to instruct trainees. Many members of the Office of Strategic Services also were trained there. It was dubbed "the school of mayhem and murder" by George Hunter White who trained at the facility in the 1950s.

From these incipient beginnings, the Office of Strategic Services opened camps in the United States, and finally abroad. Prince William Forest Park (then known as Chopawamsic Recreational Demonstration Area) was the site of an OSS training camp that operated from 1942 to 1945. Catoctin Mountain Park, now the location of Camp David, was the site of OSS training Area "B" where the first Special Operations, or SO, were trained. Special Operations was modeled after Great Britain's Special Operations Executive, which included parachute, sabotage, self-defense, weapons, and leadership training to support guerrilla or partisan resistance. Considered most mysterious of all was the "cloak and dagger" Secret Intelligence, or SI branch. Secret Intelligence employed "country estates as schools for introducing recruits into the murky world of espionage. Thus, it established Training Areas E and RTU-11 ("the Farm") in spacious manor houses with surrounding horse farms." Morale Operations training included psychological warfare and propaganda. The Congressional Country Club (Area F) in Bethesda, Maryland, was the primary OSS training facility. The Facilities of the Catalina Island Marine Institute at Toyon Bay on Santa Catalina Island, Calif., are composed (in part) of a former OSS survival training camp. The National Park Service commissioned a study of OSS National Park training facilities by Professor John Chambers of Rutgers University.

The main OSS training camps abroad were located initially in Great Britain, French Algeria, and Egypt; later as the Allies advanced, a school was established in southern Italy. In the Far East, OSS training facilities were established in India, Ceylon, and then China. The London branch of the OSS, its first overseas facility, was at 70 Grosvenor Street, W1. In addition to training local agents, the overseas OSS schools also provided advanced training and field exercises for graduates of the training camps in the United States and for Americans who enlisted in the OSS in the war zones. The most famous of the latter was Virginia Hall in France.

The OSS's Mediterranean training center in Cairo, Egypt, known to many as the Spy School, was a lavish palace belonging to King Farouk's brother-in-law, called Ras el Kanayas. It was modeled after the SOE's training facility STS 102 in Haifa, Palestine. Americans whose heritage stemmed from Italy, Yugoslavia, and Greece were trained at the "Spy School" and also sent for parachute, weapons, and commando training, and Morse code and encryption lessons at STS 102. After completion of their spy training, these agents were sent back on missions to the Balkans and Italy where their accents would not pose a problem for their assimilation.

Personnel
The names of all 13,000 OSS personnel and documents of their OSS service, previously a closely guarded secret, were released by the US National Archives on August 14, 2008.  Among the 24,000 names were those of Sterling Hayden, Carl C. Cable, Julia Child, Ralph Bunche, Arthur Goldberg, Saul K. Padover, Arthur Schlesinger, Jr., Bruce Sundlun, William Colby, René Joyeuse, and John Ford. The 750,000 pages in the 35,000 personnel files include applications of people who were not recruited or hired, as well as the service records of those who served.

OSS soldiers were primarily inducted from the United States Armed Forces. Other members included foreign nationals including displaced individuals from the former czarist Russia, an example being Prince Serge Obolensky.

Donovan sought independent thinkers, and in order to bring together those many intelligent, quick-witted individuals who could think out-of-the box, he chose them from all walks of life, backgrounds, without distinction to culture or religion. Donovan was quoted as saying, "I'd rather have a young lieutenant with enough guts to disobey a direct order than a colonel too regimented to think for himself." In a matter of a few short months, he formed an organization which equalled and then rivalled Great Britain's Secret Intelligence Service and its Special Operations Executive. Donovan, inspired by Britain's SOE, assembled an outstanding group of clinical psychologists to carry out evaluations of potential OSS candidates at a variety of sites, primary among these was Station S in Northern Virginia near where Dulles International Airport now stands. Recent research from remaining records from the OSS Station S program describes how those characteristics (independent thought, effective intelligence, interpersonal skills) were found among OSS candidates 
 One such agent was Ivy League polyglot and Jewish American baseball catcher Moe Berg, who played 15 seasons in the major leagues. As a Secret Intelligence agent, he was dispatched to seek information on German physicist Werner Heisenberg and his knowledge on the atomic bomb. One of the most highly decorated and flamboyant OSS soldiers was US Marine Colonel Peter Ortiz. Enlisting early in the war, as a French Foreign Legionnaire, he went on to join the OSS and to be the most highly decorated US Marine in the OSS during World War II.  Julia Child, who later authored cookbooks, worked directly under Donovan.
René Joyeuse M.D., MS, FACS was a Swiss, French and American soldier, physician and researcher, who distinguished himself as an agent of Allied intelligence in German-occupied France during World War II. He received the US Army Distinguished Service Cross for his actions with the OSS, after the war he became a Physician, Researcher and was a co-founder of The American Trauma Society.

"Jumping Joe" Savoldi (code name Sampson) was recruited by the OSS in 1942 because of his hand-to-hand combat and language skills as well as his deep knowledge of the Italian geography and Benito Mussolini's compound. He was assigned to the Special Operations branch and took part in missions in North Africa, Italy, and France during 1943–1945.  
 One of the forefathers of today's commandos was Navy Lieutenant Jack Taylor. He was sequestered by the OSS early in the war and had a long career behind enemy lines.

Taro and Mitsu Yashima, both Japanese political dissidents who were imprisoned in Japan for protesting its militarist regime, worked for the OSS in psychological warfare against the Japanese Empire.

Nisei linguists

In late 1943, a representative from OSS visited the 442nd Infantry Regiment looking to recruit volunteers willing to undertake "extremely hazardous assignment."  All selected were Nisei. The recruits  were assigned to OSS Detachments 101 and 202, in the China-Burma-India Theater. "Once deployed, they were to interrogate prisoners, translate documents, monitor radio communications, and conduct covert operations... Detachment 101 and 102's clandestine operations were extremely successful."

Dissolution into other agencies
On September 20, 1945, President Truman signed Executive Order 9621, terminating the OSS. The State Department took over the Research and Analysis Branch; it became the Bureau of Intelligence and Research, The War Department took over the Secret Intelligence (SI) and Counter-Espionage (X-2) Branches, which were then housed in the new Strategic Services Unit (SSU). Brigadier General John Magruder (formerly Donovan's Deputy Director for Intelligence in OSS) became the new SSU director. He oversaw the liquidation of the OSS and managed the institutional preservation of its clandestine intelligence capability.

In January 1946, President Truman created the Central Intelligence Group (CIG), which was the direct precursor to the CIA. SSU assets, which now constituted a streamlined "nucleus" of clandestine intelligence, were transferred to the CIG in mid-1946 and reconstituted as the Office of Special Operations (OSO). The National Security Act of 1947 established the Central Intelligence Agency, which then took up some OSS functions. The direct descendant of the paramilitary component of the OSS is the CIA Special Activities Division.

Today, the joint-branch United States Special Operations Command, founded in 1987, uses the same spearhead design on its insignia, as homage to its indirect lineage. The Defense Intelligence Agency currently manages the OSS’ mandate to provide strategic military intelligence to the Joint Chiefs of Staff and the Secretary of Defense and to coordinate human espionage activities across the United States Armed Forces (through the Defense Clandestine Service) and was awarded status as an OSS Heritage organization by the OSS Society.

Branches

 Censorship and Documents
 Field Experimental Unit
 Foreign Nationalities
 Maritime Unit
 Morale Operations Branch
 Operational Group Command
 Research & Analysis
 Secret Intelligence
 Security
 Special Operations
 Special Projects
 X-2 (counterespionage)

Detachments

 OSS Deer Team: Vietnam
 OSS Detachment 101: Burma
 OSS Detachment 202: China
 OSS Detachment 303: New Delhi, India
 OSS Detachment 404: attached to British South East Asia Command in Kandy, Ceylon
 OSS Detachment 505: Calcutta, India

US Army units attached to the OSS

 2671st Special Reconnaissance Battalion
 2677th Office of Strategic Services Regiment

In popular culture

Comics
 The OSS was a featured organization in DC Comics, introduced in G.I. Combat #192 (July 1976). Led by the mysterious Control, they operated as an espionage unit, initially in Nazi-occupied France. The organization would later become Argent.
 The alter ego of the DC Comics superheroine Wonder Woman, Diana Prince, works for Major Steve Trevor at the OSS. In this position, she found herself privy to intelligence on Axis operations in the United States, and many times foiled agents of Nazi Germany, Imperial Japan, and Fascist Italy in their attempts to defeat the Allies and achieve world domination.

Films
 The Paramount film O.S.S. (1946), starring Alan Ladd and Geraldine Fitzgerald, showed agents training and on a dangerous mission. Commander John Shaheen acted as technical advisor.
 The film 13 Rue Madeleine (1946) stars James Cagney as an OSS agent who must find a mole in French partisan operations. Peter Ortiz acted as technical advisor.
 The film Cloak and Dagger (1946) stars Gary Cooper as a scientist recruited to OSS to exfiltrate a German scientist defecting to the allies with the help of a woman guerrilla and her partisans. E. Michael Burke acted as technical advisor.
 In the film Charade (1963), Carson Dyle (Walter Matthau) explains the CIA and OSS to Reggie Lampert (Audrey Hepburn).
 In The Good Shepherd (2006), Matt Damon plays Edward Wilson, a Skull and Bones recruit who joins the OSS to help with a mission in London. He quickly gains rank as the head of the newly formed CIA's counterintelligence service.
 The biographical film Flash of Genius (2008) is about famed American inventor and OSS veteran Robert Kearns.
 In the film Indiana Jones and the Kingdom of the Crystal Skull 2008, it is indicated that Indiana Jones worked for the OSS and attained the rank of Colonel.
 In the film Inglourious Basterds (2009), directed by Quentin Tarantino, the titular "basterds" are members of an OSS commando squad in occupied-France, although no such OSS unit ever actually existed.
 The film Julie & Julia (2009) includes flashback scenes depicting Julia Child's wartime service with the OSS.
 The Real Inglorious Bastards (2012), a short film documentary, directed by Min Sook Lee, is about the OSS officers such as Frederick Mayer (spy), Hans Wijnberg, and Franz Weber, who volunteered to operate behind enemy lines, e.g., during "Operation Greenup", to defeat the German armed forces.
 Camp X: Secret Agent School (2014), a YAP Films documentary for History Channel (Canada), portrays the first spy school in North America, OSS agents, their training at Camp X, and their missions behind enemy lines.
 World War II Spy School (2014), a YAP Films documentary for the Smithsonian Channel, portrays Camp X and the other training sites overseas, as well as OSS agents and their missions.

Games
'Tabletop roleplaying games'
The OSS also is mentioned in Pelgrane Press The Fall of DELTA GREEN. Player Characters can be ex-OSS agents in other agencies such as the CIA, which can be beneficial due to the claim and carry authenticity, experience and authority due to their past career in the OSS.

Video games
 In Call of Duty: World at War (2008), Dr. Peter McCain is an OSS spy.
 In Indiana Jones and the Infernal Machine (1999), the main female character, Sophia Hapgood, is an OSS (later CIA) agent.
 Most games in the Medal of Honor video game franchise feature a fictional OSS agent as the main character.
 In the 2012 game Sniper Elite V2 and its prequels Sniper Elite III and Sniper Elite 4, the protagonist is an SOE turned OSS agent sniper.
 In the Wolfenstein series video game series, the main character is a member of a fictional organisation called the OSA (Office of Secret Actions), which is inspired by the OSS.
 In Tom Clancy's The Division 2, one of the games several hidden side missions, known as The Navy Hill Transmission, has the Agent searching the western part of Washington D.C. for the source of a mysterious encoded transmission which ends up leading him/her to an old underground OSS Bunker.
 It is featured in Hearts of Iron IV in the 2020 expansion, La Resistance, as the United States' Secret Agency.

Literature
 Jean Bruce's French pulp fiction series, OSS 117, follows the adventure of Hubert Bonisseur de la Bath, alias OSS 117, a French operative working for the OSS. The original series (four or five books a year) lasted from 1949 to 1963, until the death of Jean Bruce, and was continued by his wife and children until 1992. Numerous films were made from it in the 1960s, and in 2006 a nostalgic comedy was made, celebrating the spy movie genre, OSS 117: Cairo, Nest of Spies, with Jean Dujardin playing OSS 117. A sequel followed in 2009 called OSS 117: Lost in Rio (original title in French: OSS 117: Rio Ne Répond Plus).
 In Allen Ginsberg's 1975 poem 'Hadda Be Playing on the Jukebox', the OSS is referenced as having employed "Corsican goons" to break the 1948 Marseille dock strike and to have been involved in the smuggling of "Indochina heroin" in the 1960s.
 W.E.B. Griffin's Honor Bound and Men At War series revolve around fictional OSS operations. Some of his characters in The Corps Series also are recruited by the OSS, notably Ken McCoy, Edward Banning, and Fleming Pickering.
 Roger Wolcott Hall's book, You're Stepping on My Cloak and Dagger (1957), is a witty look at Hall's experiences with the OSS.
 The OSS also appears in William Stevenson's  book Intrepid's Last Case (1986).

Television
 In the American animated comedy series Archer, the character Malory Archer (mother of the main character Sterling Archer) is a former O.S.S agent.
 One of the characters in the   Ellery Queen episode, "The Adventure of Colonel Niven's Memoirs" (1975), identifies himself as "Major George Pearson, O.S.S."; he offers some Soviet diplomats political asylum.
 In 1957–1958 Ron Randell starred in the series O.S.S. In Knight Rider, Devon Miles mentions that he served in OSS during World War II.
 In the X-Files Season 6 episode, "Triangle", the woman from the 1939 scenes portrayed by Gillian Anderson as Scully is a member of OSS.

See also

 Charles Douglas Jackson
 Operation Halyard
 Operation Jedburgh
 Operation Paperclip
 OSS Detachment 101 operated in the China Burma India Theater of World War II.
 Paramarines
 Special Forces (United States Army)
 Special Operations Executive
 X-2 Counter Espionage Branch
 Central Intelligence Agency
 History of espionage
 Art Looting Investigation Unit (ALIU)

Notes
 
 
 

References

Further reading
 Albarelli, H.P. A Terrible Mistake: The Murder of Frank Olson and the CIA's Secret Cold War Experiments (2009) 
 Aldrich, Richard J. Intelligence and the War Against Japan: Britain, America and the Politics of Secret Service (Cambridge: Cambridge University Press, 2000) 
 Alsop, Stewart and Braden, Thomas. Sub Rosa: The OSS and American Espionage (New York: Reynal & Hitchcock, 1946)  
 Bank, Aaron. From OSS to Green Berets: The Birth of Special Forces (Novato, CA: Presidio, 1986) 
 Bartholomew-Feis, Dixee R. The OSS and Ho Chi Minh: Unexpected Allies in the War against Japan (Lawrence : University Press of Kansas, 2006) 
 Bernstein, Barton J. "Birth of the U.S. biological warfare program" Scientific American 256: 116 – 121, 1987.
 Brown, Anthony Cave. The Last Hero: Wild Bill Donovan (New York: Times Books, 1982) 
 Brunner, John W. OSS Weapons. Phillips Publications, Williamstown, N.J., 1994. .
 Brunner, John W. OSS Weapons II. Phillips Publications, Williamstown, N.J., 2005. .
 Brunner, John W. OSS Crossbows. Phillips Publications, Williamstown, N.J., 1991. .
 Burke, Michael.  "Outrageous Good Fortune: A Memoir"  (Boston-Toronto:  Little, Brown and Company)
 Casey, William J. The Secret War Against Hitler (Washington: Regnery Gateway, 1988) 
 Chalou, George C. (ed.) The Secrets War: The Office of Strategic Services in World War II (Washington: National Archives and Records Administration, 1991) 
 Chambers II, John Whiteclay. OSS Training in the National Parks and Service Abroad in World War II  (NPS, 2008)   online; chapters 1-2 and 8-11 provide a useful summary history of OSS by a scholar.
 Dawidoff, Nicholas. The Catcher was a Spy: The Mysterious Life of Moe Berg ( New York: Vintage Books, 1994) 
 Doundoulakis, Helias. Trained to be an OSS Spy (Xlibris, 2014) . 
 Dulles, Allen. The Secret Surrender (New York: Harper & Row, 1966) 
 Dunlop, Richard. Donovan: America's Master Spy (Chicago: Rand McNally, 1982) 
 Ford, Corey. Donovan of OSS (Boston: Little, Brown, 1970) 
 Ford, Corey, MacBain A.  "Cloak and Dagger: The Secret Story of O.S.S." (New York: Random House 1945,1946) 
 Grose, Peter. Gentleman Spy: The Life of Allen Dulles (Boston: Houghton Mifflin, 1994) 
 Hassell, A, and MacRae, S: Alliance of Enemies: The Untold Story of the Secret American and German Collaboration to End World War II, Thomas Dunne Books, 2006. 
 Hunt, E. Howard. American Spy, 2007
 Jakub, Jay. Spies and Saboteurs: Anglo-American Collaboration and Rivalry in Human Intelligence Collection and Special Operations, 1940–45 (New York: St. Martin's, 1999)
 Jones, Ishmael. The Human Factor: Inside the CIA's Dysfunctional Intelligence Culture (New York: Encounter Books, 2008, rev 2010) 
 Katz, Barry M. Foreign Intelligence: Research and Analysis in the Office of Strategic Services, 1942–1945 (Cambridge: Harvard University Press, 1989)
 Kent, Sherman. Strategic Intelligence for American Foreign Policy (Hamden, CT: Archon, 1965 [1949])
 
 McIntosh, Elizabeth P. Sisterhood of Spies: The Women of the OSS (Annapolis, MD: Naval Institute Press, 1998) 
 Mauch, Christof. The Shadow War Against Hitler: The Covert Operations of America's Wartime Secret Intelligence Service (2005), scholarly history of OSS.
 Melton, H. Keith. OSS Special Weapons and Equipment: Spy Devices of World War II (New York: Sterling Publishing, 1991) 
 Moulin, Pierre. U.S. Samurais in Bruyeres (CPL Editions: Luxembourg, 1993) 
 Paulson, A.C. 1989. OSS Silenced Pistol. Machine Gun News. 3(6):28-30.
 Paulson, A.C. 1995. OSS Weapons. Fighting Firearms. 3(2):20-21,80-81.
 Paulson, A.C. 2002. HDMS silenced .22 pistols in Vietnam. The Small Arms Review. 5(7):119-120.
 Paulson, A.C. 2003. WWII vintage silent .22LR [High Standard OSS HDMS pistol]. Guns & Weapons for Law Enforcement. 15(2):24-29,72.
 Persico, Joseph E. Roosevelt's Secret War: FDR and World War II Espionage (2001).
 Persico, Joseph E. Piercing the Reich: The Penetration of Nazi Germany by American Secret Agents During World War II (New York: Viking, 1979) Reprinted in 1997 by Barnes & Noble Books.  
 Peterson, Neal H. (ed.) From Hitler's Doorstep: The Wartime Intelligence Reports of Allen Dulles, 1942–1945 (University Park: Pennsylvania State University Press, 1996)
 Pinck, Daniel C. Journey to Peking: A Secret Agent in Wartime China (Naval Institute Press, 2003) 
 Pinck, Daniel C., Jones, Geoffrey M.T. and Pinck, Charles T. (eds.) Stalking the History of the Office of Strategic Services: An OSS Bibliography (Boston: OSS/Donovan Press, 2000) 
 Roosevelt, Kermit (ed.) War Report of the OSS, two volumes (New York: Walker, 1976) 
 Rudgers, David F. Creating the Secret State: The Origins of the Central Intelligence Agency, 1943–1947 (Lawrence, KS: University of Kansas Press, 2000) 
 Smith, Bradley F. and Agarossi, Elena. Operation Sunrise: The Secret Surrender (New York: Basic Books, 1979) 
 Smith, Bradley F. The Shadow Warriors: OSS and the Origins of the CIA (New York: Basic, 1983) 
 Smith, Richard Harris. OSS: The Secret History of America's First Central Intelligence Agency (Berkeley: University of California Press, 1972; Guilford, CT: Lyons Press, 2005) 
 Steury, Donald P. The Intelligence War (New York: Metrobooks, 2000)
 Troy, Thomas F. Donovan and the CIA: A History of the Establishment of the Central Intelligence Agency (Frederick, MD: University Publications of America, 1981) 
 Troy, Thomas F. Wild Bill & Intrepid (New Haven: Yale University Press, 1996) 
 Waller, John H. The Unseen War in Europe: Espionage and Conspiracy in the Second World War (New York: Random House, 1996) 
 Warner, Michael. The Office of Strategic Services: America's First Intelligence Agency (Washington, D.C.: Central Intelligence Agency, 2001) 
 Yu, Maochun. OSS in China: Prelude to Cold War'' (New Haven: Yale University Press, 1996)

External links

 "The Office of Strategic Services: America's First Intelligence Agency"
 National Park Service Report on OSS Training Facilities
 Collection of Documents at the Franklin D. Roosevelt Presidential Museum and Library, Part 1 and Part 2
 The OSS Society
 OSS Reborn
 
 Office of Strategic Services collection at Internet Archive
 
 

 
1942 establishments in the United States
1945 disestablishments in the United States
Agencies of the United States government during World War II
Congressional Gold Medal recipients
Defunct United States intelligence agencies
Government agencies disestablished in 1945
Government agencies established in 1942
Intelligence services of World War II
World War II espionage
World War II resistance movements